The FIBA Under-19 Basketball World Cup Most Valuable Player is a biennial award, that is given by FIBA, to the Most Valuable Player of the FIBA Under-19 World Cup.

Winners

References

Most Valuable Player
Basketball trophies and awards